Prelude in E-flat major is a 1924 piece for piano solo by the English composer John Ireland. A performance takes 5 to 6 minutes.

In 2010, the Gramophone Classical Music Guide described the piece as "haunting".

References 

Solo piano pieces by John Ireland
1924 compositions
Ireland, John
Compositions in E-flat major